Dolichesia lignaria is a moth of the subfamily Arctiinae. It was described by Rothschild in 1913. It is found in Peru.

References

Lithosiini
Moths described in 1913